Nellyadi is a small town located in the Dakshina Kannada district of Karnataka.This small town Located 275 km far from Bangalore and 70 km far from port city Mangalore. Nellyadi situated under the beauty of Western Ghat. The nearest ghat is Shiradi. This town connected to pilgrimage centre like Dharmasthala, Subramanya, Shishila and Southadka temple.

Villages in Dakshina Kannada district